Macedonia competed at the 2018 Mediterranean Games in Tarragona, Spain from 22 June to 1 July 2018.

Medals

Medalists

Karate 

Berat Jakupi won the gold medal in the men's kumite 84 kg event. Nenad Kelebikj won one of the bronze medals in the men's kumite 67 kg event. Zharko Arsovski won one of the bronze medals in the men's kumite +84 kg event.

References 

Nations at the 2018 Mediterranean Games
2018
2018 in Republic of Macedonia sport